Uluz is a rural locality (a selo) and the administrative center of Kuzhniksky Selsoviet, Tabasaransky District, Republic of Dagestan, Russia. The population was 1,807 as of 2010. There are 3 streets.

Geography 
Uluz is located 14 km west of Khuchni (the district's administrative centre) by road. Kuzhnik is the nearest rural locality.

Coordinates: 41°57′N 47°50′E / 41.950°N 47.833°E / 41.950; 47.833

References 

Rural localities in Tabasaransky District

External links 

 About Uluz